Stuntney is a village in East Cambridgeshire, located between Ely and Soham. It is just off the main road going from Newmarket to Ely, the A142.

History

Early history
The earliest record of the village itself dates back to at least 1067, where the village of 'Stuntenei', is identified an eel fishing port in the Domesday Book, and medieval remains, including a large stone coffin, have been unearthed near Stuntney, showing that an early civilisation existed near here. It was once surrounded by water and a Bronze Age causeway connected Stuntney to the nearby cathedral town of Ely. Before the course of the River Great Ouse was straightened by the Bishops of Ely in the 12th century it came right up the edge of the island on which the village stood, and docks existed on what is now agricultural land.

Recent history
1868 saw a school built in Stuntney as the population rose to around 220 (which is similar to the current population); this school was expanded in 1958 and closed in 1983.

Church of the Holy Cross. The church in Stuntney, which dates back to 1876, was built on the site of a previous Norman Church, which was demolished due to unsafe conditions. All that remains of the Norman church are three archways, one part of the present entrance. The 1876 church was also rebuilt, again for safety reasons, the second restoration taking place in 1903 when most of the nave was rebuilt.  

In the village's history there have also been a shop, which closed in 1991, and two public houses, which closed to become private residences in the late 1900s. Perhaps the greatest change in village life was the construction in 1986 of a highway bypass, which took traffic between Ely and Newmarket around the village rather than through it. Into the early 2000s, Shire horses were kept in the village; traditionally, these horses were used to work the land, but when machinery took over in the 1970s, the horses were kept for breeding purposes.

Village today
Although the village no longer has a school, a shop or a pub, the Stuntney Social Club provides refreshments for members and guests.
Stuntney Church of the Holy Cross is a Grade II* listed building and holds regular services.

The majority of the 60 houses are located across the three main roads in the village; some houses in Quanea and Nornea also belong to the village. Cole Ambrose Ltd, who have been involved in agriculture in the village since the 1600s, are located in Harlocks Farm, Stuntney.

John Harding, the novelist, was born here in 1951.

Archaeology
The region between Devil's Dyke and the line between Littleport and Shippea Hill shows a remarkable amount of archaeological findings of the Stone Age, the Bronze Age and the Iron Age

References

External links

 Village website

Villages in Cambridgeshire
East Cambridgeshire District